Anatoli Nikolayevich Katrich (born 9 July 1994) is a Russian professional football player. He plays as right midfielder for FC Amkal Moscow.

Club career
He made his professional debut on 12 April 2015 for FC Dynamo Moscow in a Russian Premier League game against FC Mordovia Saransk.

On 8 July 2018, he signed a 1-year contract with FC Krasnodar. After he made only one Cup appearance for the main squad in the first half of the season, his contract was dissolved by mutual consent on 20 December 2018.

On 22 February 2019, he signed with FC Ural Yekaterinburg. He left Ural on 7 June 2019.

Career statistics

References

External links
 
 
 

1994 births
People from Primorsko-Akhtarsky District
Sportspeople from Krasnodar Krai
Living people
Russian footballers
Association football midfielders
FC Dynamo Moscow players
FC Krasnodar-2 players
FC Krasnodar players
FC Ural Yekaterinburg players
FC Luch Vladivostok players
FC Tekstilshchik Ivanovo players
FC Atyrau players
Russian Premier League players
Russian First League players
Russian Second League players
Kazakhstan Premier League players
Russian expatriate footballers
Expatriate footballers in Kazakhstan
Russian expatriate sportspeople in Kazakhstan